Luis Alfredo López Pedraza (born April 2, 1966 in Sogamoso, Boyacá) is a retired male road cyclist from Colombia.

Career
   
1995
1st in General Classification Vuelta a Venezuela (VEN)
1st in Stage 2 Clásico RCN, Cali (COL)

References
 

1966 births
Living people
Colombian male cyclists
People from Sogamoso
Sportspeople from Boyacá Department
20th-century Colombian people
21st-century Colombian people